Vânătorii Mici is a commune located in Giurgiu County, Muntenia, Romania. It is composed of eight villages: Corbeanca, Cupele, Izvoru, Poiana lui Stângă, Vâlcelele, Vânătorii Mari, Vânătorii Mici and Zădăriciu.

References

Communes in Giurgiu County
Localities in Muntenia